U.S. Route 50 Alternate  may refer to:

U.S. Route 50 Alternate (Nevada), a road in Nevada between Silver Springs and Fallon, via Fernley
U.S. Route 50 Alternate (California), a road between Pollock Pines and Lake Tahoe

50 Alternate
Alternate
50 Alternate